Oathlaw is a village in Angus, Scotland, 4 miles north of Forfar.

References

Villages in Angus, Scotland